AudioFile is a print and online magazine whose mission is to review "unabridged and abridged audiobooks, original audio programs, commentary, and dramatizations in the spoken-word format. The focus of reviews is the audio presentation, not the critique of the written material." AudioFile is published six times a year in Portland, Maine.

Launch
The publication was launched in 1992 as a 12-page black & white newsletter containing about 50 critical reviews of audiobooks, focused on new releases. In 1997, it switched to a 36-page color magazine format containing about 60 reviews per issue and interviews with authors, readers, and publishers.

Online
In 2000, AudioFile launched an online database of past issues. Current issues were offered online beginning in 2001.

Earphones Awards
AudioFile bestows Earphones Awards to presentations which are deemed to excel in the following criteria:
 Narrative voice and style
 Vocal characterizations
 Appropriateness for the audio format
 Enhancement of the text

SYNC Audiobooks for Teens
AudioFile sponsors the SYNC Audiobooks for Teens, a "free summer program for teens 13+." The program provides subscribers with two free and  complete audiobook downloads paired thematically each week during its summer season. The season varies in length from 10-16 weeks. The audiobook files are delivered via the OverDrive Media Console.

References

External links
 Official website

Audiobooks
Bimonthly magazines published in the United States
Book review magazines
Literary magazines published in the United States
Magazines established in 1992
Magazines published in Maine
Mass media in Portland, Maine
1992 establishments in Maine